Vector-R (Vector Rapid) is a two-stage orbital expendable launch vehicle under development by the American aerospace company Vector Launch to cover the commercial small satellite launch segment (CubeSats). Vector Launch went bankrupt in December 2019 and re-emerged in October 2020. Two prototypes were launched in 2017.

The rocket completed a maiden test flight at low altitude in May 2017. Vector Launch was planning the maiden orbital launch from the Pacific Spaceport Complex in Alaska in 2019, but paused operation in August 2019 due to an uncertain financing situation.

An upgraded version of the Vector-R, called the Vector-H (Heavy), is in development as well.

Design

Vector-R plans to use two stages with a  diameter first stage and  diameter second stage, both filled with propylene/LOX propellant. The main body of the rocket will be constructed using a lightweight carbon composite material.

The launch vehicle's first stage was to be powered by three LP-1 LOX/propylene engines, delivering 81,000 newtons of force. The second stage was to be powered by one LP-2 LOX/propylene engine, delivering 4,400 newtons of force. The engines used a 3D-printed engine injector, designed with help from NASA's Science, Technology and Mission Directorate (STMD) Flight Opportunities program. This allows the injector to be produced as a single piece of hardware, instead of as individual components.

Vector was aiming the rocket at a launch cadence of 100 vehicles per year.

Block 0.1
The first two sub-orbital flight tests used the Vector-R Block 0.1 prototype model, which was a full size aluminum air-frame of the Vector-R but with only one first stage engine.

Vector-RE1
The Vector-RE1, a planned variant, was planned to use the same body as the standard Vector-R but include an electric powered third stage.

Intended usage
Vector-R was designed to launch a  payload to a  Sun-synchronous orbit, suitable for CubeSats and other small satellites. Customers could have chosen to encapsulate their spacecraft in payload fairings provided by the company, which could be attached to the rocket shortly before launch, in several different configurations, such as fitting CubeSats dispensers or multiple satellites in a single fairing.

Vector used on-site payload integration for the early launches. However it was expected to be able to integrate payloads at their Arizona and California payload facilities and ship them to their launch sites.

Launch sites

Vector-R launched from the Mojave Air and Space Port and Spaceport Camden for its flight tests. It had completed one test flight from each pad. Flight B0.002 was also the first launch from Spaceport Camden.

Vector planned to use the LC-46 launch site in Florida and the Mid-Atlantic Regional Spaceport (MARS) Pad 0B for the Vector-R rocket, with the first all-up launches would have occurred from MARS Pad 0B. Additionally, Vector investigated adding more minimal infrastructure launch pads either located on land in the US, or to launch the rocket from barges on the ocean.

Vector had planned for the maiden orbital launch from Kodiak Spaceport Launch Complex earlier in 2019.

Launch statistics

Two low altitude suborbital test flights  were performed in 2017.

Launch sites

Launch outcomes

Launch history

Planned launches
Due to the bankruptcy and subsequent re-emergence of Vector, These launches are uncertain.

See also
Small-lift launch vehicle

References

Microsatellite launch vehicles